Edwin Cole McCain (born January 20, 1970) is an American singer-songwriter and guitarist. His songs "I'll Be" (1998) and "I Could Not Ask for More" (1999) were radio top-40 hits in the U.S., and five of his albums have reached the Billboard 200. McCain has released eleven albums, with his first two being released independently.

Career
McCain graduated from Christ Church Episcopal School in Greenville, South Carolina, and briefly attended both the College of Charleston and Coastal Carolina University. Longtime touring friends with Hootie and the Blowfish, the Edwin McCain band signed with the same label, Atlantic Records. In 1994, he recorded his first major-label album, Honor Among Thieves under the Lava Records imprint (Matchbox Twenty, Kid Rock and Jewel). The record was then released in 1995. His second album, Misguided Roses, spawned "I'll Be", a major hit single in 1998. This song also is featured on the charitable album, Live in the X Lounge, along with a live version of "Solitude". It was also featured in the 2000 drama television show, Higher Ground, as well as the 2004 teen flick, A Cinderella Story.

Summer of 1999 marked the arrival of McCain's third album, Messenger, which included a second Top 40 hit, the Diane Warren-penned "I Could Not Ask For More." Produced by Matt Serletic (Matchbox Twenty, Collective Soul) and Noel Golden, Messenger was recorded at Tree Sound Studios and Southern Tracks in Atlanta as well as Record Plant Studios in Los Angeles. "I Could Not Ask For More" was also featured on the soundtrack for the 1999 film Message in a Bottle.

Having fulfilled his four-album contract, McCain split from Lava/Atlantic at the end of 2001. In early 2003 he released a collection of acoustic versions of old and new songs called The Austin Sessions via ATC Records, a Nashville-based independent record label (at which McCain was the first artist signed following its creation in 2001.) Sessions, recorded in roughly 20 days, punctuated McCain's major-label departure with an intentionally stripped-down sound and offered some fan favorites from his early days of touring, including Dire Straits' "Romeo and Juliet". The album, coupled with McCain's first DVD, Mile Marker: Songs and Stories from the Acoustic Highway (2002) – which consisted of interviews, live performances and other material – served as a thank-you to longtime followers. In a May 2003 interview with Billboard, McCain noted, "The whole package is sort of saying, 'I'm back doing what I started doing.'" About the same time, the musician also hosted "Inside Music With Edwin McCain", a syndicated show on the Sirius radio network.

Mid-2004 saw the arrival of his first studio album in three years, titled Scream & Whisper, which was released on another indie label, DRT Entertainment. Later that year, McCain made time in his tour schedule to run the 35th annual New York City Marathon. In an interview in the August 2004 issue of Runner's World, McCain said of training on the road: "You just pick your spots. One of the things that comes in handy depends on how far away the hotel is from the venue. ... For example, the other day the hotel was five miles away from the club where I was performing, so once we got to the club and got sound checked I threw on my running clothes, then ran back to the hotel. Little things like that help." In late 2004 McCain released his second DVD, Tinsel and Tap Shoes. It was his first live concert DVD, recorded at The House of Blues in Myrtle Beach, South Carolina.

In 2005, McCain released a single, "Hold Out a Hand," co-written and performed with singer/songwriter Maia Sharp. This song, available for a 99-cent download on iTunes, gives all profits to the relief of the hurricane victims that year. McCain's next album, Lost in America, was released on April 11, 2006, on Vanguard Records. Lost in America contained three singles: "Truly Believe", "The Kiss" and live-favorite "Gramercy Park Hotel", which pays homage to the New York City landmark and its colorful patrons (including baseball legend Babe Ruth.) A subsequent recording, a collection of R&B cover songs titled "Nobody's Fault But Mine", was produced by Tor Hyams and released through Saguaro Road Records on June 24, 2008, and included a version of Soul Brothers Six song "Some Kind of Wonderful."

On May 17, 2009, McCain performed on board the USS John C. Stennis, while the carrier was on a Western Pacific deployment in the vicinity of Guam. The next year saw the release of The Best of Edwin McCain, a 20-year career retrospective that included a cross-section of material as well as a new single, "Walk With You" (produced by Don Was.) McCain's 10th album, Mercy Bound, was released August 30, 2011, on 429 Records. Reuniting McCain with collaborator Maia Sharp, who also had production credits, Mercy Bound features additional artistic input from Angie Aparo, Mark Addison and Anders Osborne, as well as guitar work from Warren Haynes.

McCain is also a ship restorer, as seen on the former Animal Planet TV series Flipping Ships.

On January 22, 2017, McCain sang the American National Anthem at Gillette Stadium for the AFC Championship Game between the New England Patriots and Pittsburgh Steelers. On November 29, 2019, McCain released his first Christmas album, Merry Christmas, Baby.

Band members

While his albums are released under his name, he does have a permanent band, referred to as the Edwin McCain Band. Members of the band include Larry Chaney (lead guitar), Pete Riley (rhythm guitar and vocals), Craig Shields (keyboards, saxophone and other wind instruments), Jason Pomar (bass guitar and vocals) and Tez Sherard (drums and percussion).

Discography

Independent albums

Studio albums

EPs

Compilations

Soundtrack

Singles

References

External links

 

1970 births
Living people
429 Records artists
American alternative rock musicians
American rock guitarists
American male guitarists
Lava Records artists
Musicians from Greenville, South Carolina
Vanguard Records artists
Alternative rock guitarists
Alternative rock singers
American male singer-songwriters
American rock singers
American rock songwriters
20th-century American singers
21st-century American singers
American television personalities
Male television personalities
20th-century American guitarists
21st-century American guitarists
Guitarists from South Carolina
20th-century American male singers
21st-century American male singers
Singer-songwriters from South Carolina